Rectors of the Thomasschule zu Leipzig (St. Thomas School of Leipzig), in Leipzig, Germany have included:

 1676 Jakob Thomasius
 1730 Johann Matthias Gesner
 1734 Johann August Ernesti
 1835 Johann Gottfried Stallbaum
 1863 Friedrich August Eckstein

Rectors of the St. Thomas School of Leipzig
St. Thomas School of Leipzig
Thomasschule zu Leipzig
St. Thomas School, Leipzig